L-AP4 (L-2-amino-4-phosphonobutyric acid) is a drug used in scientific research, which acts as a group-selective agonist for the group III metabotropic glutamate receptors (mGluR4/6/7/8). It was the first ligand found to act as an agonist selective for this group of mGlu receptors, but does not show selectivity between the different mGluR Group III subtypes. It is widely used in the study of this receptor family and their various functions.

References 

Amino acids
Phosphonic acids
MGlu4 receptor agonists
MGlu6 receptor agonists
MGlu7 receptor agonists
MGlu8 receptor agonists